Charitopsis may refer to:
 Charitopsis (fish), an extinct genus of prehistoric bony fish
 Charitopsis (wasp), a wasp genus in the subfamily Encyrtinae